A secular state is an idea pertaining to secularity, whereby a state is or purports to be officially neutral in matters of religion, supporting neither religion nor irreligion. A secular state claims to treat all its citizens equally regardless of religion, and claims to avoid preferential treatment for a citizen based on their religious beliefs, affiliation or lack of either over those with other profiles.

Although secular states have no state religion, the absence of an established state religion does not mean that a state is completely secular or egalitarian. For example, some states that describe themselves as secular have religious references in their national anthems and flags, or laws that benefit one religion or another.

Origin and practice
Secularity can be established at a state's creation (e.g., the Soviet Union, the United States) or by it later secularizing (e.g., France or Nepal). Movements for laïcité in France and separation of church and state in the United States have defined modern concepts of secularism, the United States of America being the first explicitly secular nation in history. Historically, the process of secularisation typically involves granting religious freedom, disestablishing state religions, stopping public funds being used for religion, freeing the legal system from religious control, freeing up the education system, tolerating citizens who change religion or abstain from religion, and allowing political leaders to come to power regardless of their religious beliefs.

In France, Italy, and Spain, for example, official holidays for the public administration tend to be Christian feast days. Any private school in France that contracts with Éducation nationale means its teachers are salaried by the state—most of the Catholic schools are in this situation and, because of history, they are the majority; however, any other religious or non-religious schools also contract this way. In some European states where secularism confronts monoculturalist philanthropy, some of the main Christian sects and sects of other religions depend on the state for some of the financial resources for their religious charities. It is common in corporate law and charity law to prohibit organized religion from using those funds to organize religious worship in a separate place of worship or for conversion; the religious body itself must provide the religious content, educated clergy and laypersons to exercise its own functions and may choose to devote part of their time to the separate charities. To that effect, some of those charities establish secular organizations that manage part of or all of the donations from the main religious bodies.

Religious and non-religious organizations can apply for equivalent funding from the government and receive subsidies based on either assessed social results where there is indirect religious state funding, or simply the number of beneficiaries of those organizations. This resembles charitable choice in the United States. It is doubtful whether overt direct state funding of religions is in accordance with the European Convention on Human Rights. Apparently, this issue has not yet been decided at a supranational level in ECtHR case law stemming from the rights in the International Covenant on Civil and Political Rights, which mandates non-discrimination in affording its co-listed basic social rights. Specifically, funding certain services would not accord with non-discriminatory state action.

Many states that are nowadays secular in practice may have legal vestiges of an earlier established religion. Secularism also has various guises that may coincide with some degree of official religiosity. In the United Kingdom, the head of state is still required to take the Coronation Oath enacted in 1688, swearing to maintain the Protestant Reformed religion and to preserve the established Church of England. The UK also maintains seats in the House of Lords for 26 senior clergymen of the Church of England, known as the Lords Spiritual. In Canada the Canadian Charter of Rights and Freedoms affords secular freedoms of conscience and religion, thought, belief, opinion and expression, including communication, assembly and association yet the Charter's preamble maintains the concept of "the supremacy of God" which would appear to disadvantage those who hold nontheistic or polytheistic beliefs, including atheism and Buddhism. Italy has been a secular state since the enactment of the Constitution in 1948 (stressed by a Constitutional court's decision in 1985), but still recognizes a special status for the Catholic Church. The reverse progression can also occur, however; a state can go from being secular to being a religious state, as in the case of Iran where the secularized Imperial State of Iran was replaced by an Islamic Republic. Nonetheless, the last 250 years has seen a trend towards secularism.

List of secular states by continent
This is the list of countries that are explicitly described as secular in their constitutions or other official state documents.

Africa

Americas

  Antigua and Barbuda
  Argentina
  Bahamas
  Barbados
  Belize
  Bolivia
  Brazil
  Canada
  Chile
  Colombia
  Cuba
  Dominica
  Dominican Republic
  Ecuador
  El Salvador
  Grenada
  Guatemala
  Guyana
  Haiti
  Honduras
  Jamaica
  Mexico
  Nicaragua
  Paraguay
  Panama
  Peru
  Saint Kitts and Nevis
  Saint Lucia
  Saint Vincent and the Grenadines
  Suriname
  Trinidad and Tobago
  United States
  Uruguay
  Venezuela

Asia

Europe

Oceania

Transcontinental countries

Former secular states
  Confederate States of America (1861–1865)
  (1972–1977)
 Bangladesh was de facto a secular state from 1972 to 1977, when secularism was removed from the constitution by a Martial Law and the Parliament of Bangladesh declared Islam as the state religion in 1988.
  Democratic Republic of Afghanistan (1980–1987)
 Afghanistan became a secular state after the Soviet invasion but Islam became the official religion again in 1987.
  People's Republic of Kampuchea (1979-1993)
 Kampuchea was a secular state from 1979 until the restoration of its monarchy in 1993.
  Imperial State of Iran (1925–1979)
 Iran was a secular state until 1979, when Mohammad Reza Pahlavi was overthrown and an Islamic republic was instituted.
  (1932–1993)
 Iraq became a secular state in 1932 after its independence. However, the Ba'athist regime led by Saddam Hussein launched the Return to Faith campaign in 1993 and placed significant emphasis on Islam within all sectors of state and public life.
  Myanmar (formerly Burma) (1885-1961; 1962-2008)
 Myanmar was a secular state during the colonial period and post-independence period until 1961 and again under the socialist regime, and the military regime until 2008.
  (1962–2017)
 In 2017, the Samoan legislative assembly approved a constitutional amendment that instituted Christianity as the state religion.

Ambiguous states
 
 According to Section 2 of the Constitution of Argentina, "The Federal Government supports the Roman Catholic Apostolic religion" but it does not stipulate an official state religion, nor a separation of church and state. In practice, however, the country is mostly secular, and there is no kind of persecution of people of other religions; they are completely accepted and even encouraged in their activities.
 
 The constitution formally separates the church from the state; however, it recognizes the Armenian Apostolic Church as the national church.
 
 There is a constitutional ambiguity that makes Bangladesh both secular and Islamic. Freedom of religion is guaranteed by its constitution in which it gives equal rights to all citizens irrespective of religion. In 2010, the High Court held up the secular principles of the 1972 constitution.
 
 Though it forbids in any degree the State to "establish religious cults or churches, subsidize them, hamper their operation or maintain with them or their representative's relations of dependency or alliance, with the exception of cooperation for the public interest, as set forth in the law," the Constitution of Brazil states that it is promulgated "under the protection of God."
 Despite being mostly secular, it is normal to see religious symbols (such as crucifixes) in State facilities (hospitals, schools, courts, police stations).
 According to Article 208 of the Brazilian Penal Code "mock someone publicly, by reason of belief or religious function; prevent or disrupt ceremony or practice of religious worship; publicly vilify act or object of religious worship" incurs in a penalty of "detention of one month to one year or a fine".
 
 The "Fundamental Freedoms" section of the Canadian Charter of Rights and Freedoms states: "2. Everyone has the following fundamental freedoms: (a) freedom of conscience and religion; (b) freedom of thought, belief, opinion and expression, including freedom of the press and other media of communication; (c) freedom of peaceful assembly; and (d) freedom of association." Canadians are therefore free to have their own beliefs and opinions, are free to practice religion or refrain, and are free to establish media organizations with or without religious content, and these freedoms are constitutionally protected. However, according to the Charter's preamble, "Canada is founded upon principles that recognize the supremacy of God." This portion of the preamble has not been accorded legal effect in Charter jurisprudence. The constitutional recognition of God has been criticized as conflicting in principle with the fundamental freedom of conscience and religion guaranteed in section 2, as it would disadvantage those who hold nontheistic or polytheistic beliefs, including atheism and Buddhism. The Province of Quebec has legislation declaring it to be a lay state.
 
 Although Article 3 of the El Salvadoran constitution states, "no restrictions shall be established that are based on differences of nationality, race, sex or religion", Article 26 states that the state recognizes the Catholic Church and gives it legal preference.
 
 Claims to be secular, but the Evangelical Lutheran Church of Finland and the Finnish Orthodox Church have the right to collect church tax from their members in conjunction with government income tax. In addition to membership tax, businesses also used to contribute financially to the church through tax, but as of 2016, that is no longer the case.
 
 Georgia gives distinct recognition to the Georgian Orthodox Church in Article 9 of the Constitution of Georgia and through the Concordat of 2002. However, the Constitution also guarantees "absolute freedom of belief and religion". Georgian constitution also refers to God in preamble: "We, the citizens of Georgia – whose firm will... proclaim this Constitution before God and the nation."
 
 The German Basic Law guarantees the separation of church and state and the freedom of religion, but this separation is not complete. For recognized religious communities, some church taxes are collected by the state; this is at the request of the religious community and a fee is charged for the service.
 
 Indonesia follows the principle of Pancasila, where the first principle states "Belief in the Almighty God", while itself is a semi secular state. Indonesia does not use Islamic law with the exception of Islamic personal statues laws. There is no official state religion in Indonesia, but the state acknowledges Buddhism, Confucianism, Hinduism, Islam, Protestantism and Catholicism as the recognized religions in the country as well as traditional folk religions. Because of this, despite being a semi secular state, Indonesia does not acknowledge atheism as a religion and recommend each citizen to state their religion on their identity cards, though currently this is optional.
 
 The Constitution of India, declares India to be a secular state with no state religion. However, at the same time, "the Republic of India privileges Hinduism as state sponsored religion" through constitutionally, legislatively and culturally. The original copy of Indian constitution have the illustration of Hindu deities Rama, Sita, and Lakshmana in Part III on Fundamental Rights and Rama has been considered as true guardian of people's rights. Also Article 48 of Indian constitution, prohibits the slaughter of cows or calf, (a sacred animal in Hinduism) and is illegal criminal offense in most of the states of India.
 
 There are a few sections of the Constitution of Ireland that refer to God.
 In the Preamble it is mentioned, "In the Name of the Most Holy Trinity, from Whom is all authority and to Whom, as our final end, all actions both of men and States must be referred, We, the people of Éire, Humbly acknowledging all our obligations to our Divine Lord, Jesus Christ, Who sustained our fathers through centuries of trial...".
 In Article 6 it is mentioned, "1 All powers of government, legislative, executive and judicial, derive, under God, from the people...".
 Article 12, item 8 instructs the President to make the following declaration: "In the presence of Almighty God I do solemnly and sincerely promise and declare that I will maintain the Constitution of Ireland and uphold its laws, that I will fulfill my duties faithfully and conscientiously in accordance with the Constitution and the law, and that I will dedicate my abilities to the service and welfare of the people of Ireland. May God direct and sustain me".
 Article 31, item 4 establishes that every member of the Council of State supports the following declaration: "In the presence of Almighty God I do solemnly and sincerely promise and declare that I will faithfully and conscientiously fulfill my duties as a member of the Council of State".
 Article 34, item 6 establishes that every person appointed a judge under this Constitution shall make and subscribe the following declaration: "In the presence of Almighty God I do solemnly and sincerely promise and declare that I will duly and faithfully and to the best of my knowledge and power execute the office of Chief Justice (or as the case may be) without fear or favour, affection or ill-will towards any man, and that I will uphold the Constitution and the laws. May God direct and sustain me".
 In Article 44, item 1 it is mentioned, "The State acknowledges that the homage of public worship is due to Almighty God. It shall hold His Name in reverence, and shall respect and honour religion".
 However, in the same Constitution, in Article 44, item 2, it is mentioned:
 "1° Freedom of conscience and the free profession and practice of religion are, subject to public order and morality, guaranteed to every citizen".
 "2° The State guarantees not to endow any religion".
 "3° The State shall not impose any disabilities or make any discrimination on the ground of religious profession, belief or status".
 "4° Legislation providing State aid for schools shall not discriminate between schools under the management of different religious denominations, nor be such as to affect prejudicially the right of any child to attend a school receiving public money without attending religious instruction at that school".
 "5° Every religious denomination shall have the right to manage its own affairs, own, acquire and administer property, movable and immovable, and maintain institutions for religious or charitable purposes".
 "6° The property of any religious denomination or any educational institution shall not be diverted save for necessary works of public utility and on payment of compensation".
 On July 4, 2019, the on-duty Taoiseach Leo Varadkar said "Ten months ago we welcomed Pope Francis to Ireland. Speaking in this room, I suggested that I believed the time had come to build a new relationship between Religion and the State in Ireland - a new covenant for the 21st Century. One in which religion is no longer at the centre of our State but continues to have a real and meaningful role to play on our society".
 Most of the public schools in Ireland are confessional and there are some reports of abuse by some institutions.
 
 When the idea of modern political Zionism was introduced by Theodor Herzl, his idea was that Israel would be a secular state which would not be influenced at all by religion. When David Ben-Gurion founded the state of Israel, he put religious parties in government next to secular Jews in the same governing coalition. Many secular Israelis feel constrained by the religious sanctions imposed on them. Many businesses close on Shabbat, including many forms of public transportation, restaurants, and Israeli airline El Al. In order for a Jewish couple to be formally married in Israel, a couple has to be married by a rabbi. Jewish married couples can only be divorced by a rabbinical council. Many secular Israelis may go abroad to be married, often in Cyprus. Marriages officiated abroad are recognized as official marriages in Israel. Also, all food at army bases and in cafeterias of government buildings has to be kosher. Many religious symbols have found their way into Israeli national symbols. For example, the flag of the country is similar to a tallit, or prayer shawl, with its blue stripes. The national coat of arms also displays the menorah. However, some viewpoints argue that these symbols can be interpreted as ethnic/cultural symbols too, and point out that many secular European nations (Sweden, Norway and Georgia) have religious symbols on their flags. Reports have considered Israel to be a secular state, and its definition as a "Jewish state" refers to the Jewish people, who include people with varying relations to the Jewish religion including non-believers, rather than to the Jewish religion itself.
 
 Under the terms of its preamble, the Constitution of Kiribati is proclaimed by "the people of Kiribati, acknowledging God as the Almighty Father in whom we put trust". However, there is no established church or state religion, and article 11 of the Constitution protects each person's "freedom of thought and of religion, freedom to change his religion or belief", and freedom of public or private religious practice and education.
 
 According to the Lao Constitution, Buddhism is given special privileges in the country. The state respects and protects all the lawful activities of Buddhism.
 
 In Article 3 of the Constitution of Malaysia, Islam is stated as the official religion of the country: "Islam is the religion of the Federation; but other religions may be practiced in peace and harmony in any part of the Federation." In 1956, the Alliance party submitted a memorandum to the Reid Commission, which was responsible for drafting the Malayan constitution. The memorandum quoted: "The religion of Malaya shall be Islam. The observance of this principle shall not impose any disability on non-Muslim nationals professing and practicing their own religion and shall not imply that the state is not a secular state." The full text of the Memorandum was inserted into paragraph 169 of the Commission Report. This suggestion was later carried forward in the Federation of Malaya Constitutional Proposals 1957 (White Paper), specifically quoting in paragraph 57: "There has been included in the proposed Federal Constitution a declaration that Islam is the religion of the Federation. This will in no way affect the present position of the Federation as a secular State...." The Cobbold Commission also made another similar quote in 1962: "....we are agreed that Islam should be the national religion for the Federation. We are satisfied that the proposal in no way jeopardises freedom of religion in the Federation, which in effect would be secular." In December 1987, the Lord President of the Supreme Court, Salleh Abas described Malaysia as governed by "secular law" in a court ruling. In the early 1980s, then-prime minister Mahathir Mohamad implemented an official programme of Islamization, in which Islamic values and principles were introduced into public sector ethics, substantial financial support to the development of Islamic religious education, places of worship and the development of Islamic banking. The Malaysian government also made efforts to expand the powers of Islamic-based state statutory bodies such as the Tabung Haji, JAKIM (Department of Islamic Development Malaysia), and the National Fatwa Council. There has been much continued public debate on whether Malaysia is an Islamic or secular state.
 
 Article 19 of the 2008 Myanmar constitution states, "The State recognizes the special position of Buddhism as the faith professed by the great majority of the citizens of the State." while Article 20 mentions "The State also recognizes Christianity, Islam, Hinduism and Animism as the religions existing in the Union on the date on which the State Constitution comes into force." The government pursues a policy of religious pluralism and tolerance in the country, as stipulated in Article 21 of its constitution, "The State shall render assistance and protect as it possibly can the religions it recognizes." In 1956, the Burmese ambassador in Indonesia U Mya Sein quoted, "The Constitution of the Union of Burma provides for a Secular State although it endorses that Buddhism is professed by the majority (90 per cent) of the nation." Since 2008, Buddhism has a privileged status in Myanmar and is declared to be the state religion. The government provides funding to state Universities to Buddhist monks, mandated the compulsory recital of Buddhist prayers in public schools and patronizes the Buddhist clergy from time to time to rally popular support and political legitimization.
 
 The Constitution of Nauru opens by stating, "the people of Nauru acknowledge God as the almighty and everlasting Lord and the giver of all good things". However, there is no state religion or established church, and article 11 of the Constitution protects each person's "right to freedom of conscience, thought and religion, including freedom to change his religion or beliefs and freedom", and right to practice his or her religion.
 
 The Constitution of Nepal provides freedom of religion and denies the right to convert another person. The previous constitution of 1990, which was in effect until 2007, described the country as a "Hindu Kingdom". With the new Constitution, the Interim Parliament officially declared the country a secular state in January 2007, but no laws specifically affecting freedom of religion were changed. Adherents of the country's many religious groups generally coexisted peacefully and respected places of worship, although there were reports of societal abuses and discrimination based on religious belief or practice. Those who converted to another religious group at times faced violence and occasionally were ostracized socially but generally did not fear to admit their affiliations in public.
 
 Norway changed the wording of the constitution on 21 May 2012, to remove references to the state church. Until 2017, the Church of Norway was not a separate legal entity from the government. In 2017, it was disestablished and became a national church, a legally distinct entity from the state with special constitutional status. The King of Norway is required by the Constitution to be a member of the Church of Norway, and the church is regulated by special canon law, unlike other religions.
 
 The Romanian constitution declares freedom of religion, but all recognized religious denominations remain to some extent state-funded. Since 1992, these denominations have also maintained a monopoly on the sale of religious merchandise, which includes all candles except decorative candles and candles for marriage and baptism. It is currently illegal in Romania to sell cult candles without the approval of the Eastern Orthodox Church or of another religious denomination which employs candles (law 103/1992, appended O.U.G. nr.92/2000 to specify penalties). Romania recognizes 18 denominations/religions: various sects of the Eastern Orthodox Church, the Catholic Church, Protestantism and Neo-Protestantism (including Jehovah's Witnesses), Judaism and Sunni Islam. Unrecognized cults or denominations are not prohibited, however.
 
 The preamble of the Constitution of Seychelles begins the second line with "GRATEFUL to Almighty God".
 
 The Sri Lankan constitution does not cite a state religion. However, Article 9 of Chapter 2, which states "The Democratic Socialist Republic of Sri Lanka shall give to Buddhism the foremost place, and accordingly, it shall be the duty of the State to protect and foster the Buddha Sasana" makes Sri Lanka an ambiguous state with respect to secularism. In 2004, Jathika Hela Urumaya proposed a constitutional amendment that would make a clear reference to Buddhism as the state religion, which was rejected by the Supreme Court of Sri Lanka.
 
 The Swiss Confederation remains secular at the federal level. However, the constitution begins with the words "In the name of Almighty God!"
 24 of the 26 cantons support either the Catholic Church or the Swiss Reformed Church.
 
 Semi secular state with Islamic jurisprudence being used for personal statues laws.
 
 Section 9 of the 2007 Thai constitution states, "The King is a Buddhist and Upholder of religions", and section 79 makes another related reference: "The State shall patronise and protect Buddhism as the religion observed by most Thais for a long period of time and other religions, promote good understanding and harmony among followers of all religions as well as encourage the application of religious principles to create virtue and develop the quality of life." The United States Department of State characterized that these provisions provide Buddhism as the de facto official religion of Thailand. There have been calls by Buddhists to make an explicit reference to Buddhism as the country's state religion, but the government has turned down these requests. Academics and legal experts have argued that Thailand is a secular state as provisions in its penal code are generally secular and irreligious by nature.
 
 The Constitution of Tonga opens by referring to "the will of God that man should be free". Article 6 provides, "the Sabbath Day shall be kept holy", and prohibits any "commercial undertaking" on that day. Article 5 provides: "All men are free to practice their religion and to worship God as they may deem fit in accordance with the dictates of their own worship consciences and to assemble for religious service in such places as they may appoint". There is no established church or state religion. Any preaching on public radio or television is required to be done "within the limits of the mainstream Christian tradition", though no specific religious denomination is favoured.
 
 The Republic of Turkey is officially a secular country. Although the current governing party has a close affinity with Sunni Islam, the latest Constitution of 1982 neither recognizes an official religion nor promotes any. The Directorate of Religious Affairs, an official state institution established by Mustafa Kemal Atatürk in 1924, expresses opinions on religious matters and is responsible for all administration of the Sunni institutions.
 
 According to the Establishment Clause of the First Amendment to the United States Constitution, together with the Free Exercise Clause, which forms the constitutional right of freedom of religion, "Congress shall make no law respecting an establishment of religion, or prohibiting the free exercise thereof." An act of Congress changed the official United States motto to "In God we trust". Prior to this act of Congress, the official motto of the United States had been "E pluribus Unum" or "out of many, one" since the country's creation. Additionally, the motto of "In God we trust" has been printed on their currency since 1864.

See also

 Civil religion
 Freedom of religion
 Secular education
 Secularism
 Secularity
 Secular religion
 Separation of church and state
 State atheism
 State religion
 Theocracy

Notes

References

Bibliography
 Temperman, Jeroen, State Religion Relationships and Human Rights Law: Towards a Right to Religiously Neutral Governance, BRILL, 2010, 

Constitutional law
Secularism
Religion and politics
Religion and government
Religious policy